Naegle is a surname. It is similar to Neagle.

List of people with the surname 
Stephen Howard Naegle (born 1938), American painter
Sue Naegle, American business executive
Walter Naegle (born 1949), American civil rights and LGBT activist

Fictional characters 

 Lindsay Naegle, in The Simpsons

See also 

 Naegelen

Surnames
Surnames of British Isles origin
Surnames of English origin
Surnames of Welsh origin